Charles Avery may refer to:
 Charles Avery (actor) (1873–1926), American actor
 Charles Avery (artist) (born 1973), Scottish artist
 Charles Avery (pianist) (1892–1974), American pianist
 Ham Avery (Charles Hammond Avery, 1854–1927), American lawyer and baseball umpire

See also